The 2020 Stanford Cardinal baseball team represents Stanford University in the 2020 NCAA Division I baseball season. The Cardinal play their home games at Klein Field at Sunken Diamond under third year coach David Esquer.

Previous season
The Cardinal started February off hot winning the 2019 Angels College Classic and kept going through March winning the series against ranked Cal State Fullerton and ranked Texas five of the seven games. They continued winning when they got into the conference season but would stumble against #1 ranked UCLA losing two of three to them. 

Stanford finished second in the Pac-12 conference and got their own Regional beating Sacramento State twice and then would take two of three against Fresno State. Next, the Cardinal went to the Starkville Super Regional and lose in double elimination to Mississippi State.

2019 MLB draft
The Cardinal had nine players drafted in the 2019 MLB draft.

Players in bold are signees drafted from high school that will attend Stanford.

Personnel

Roster

Coaching staff

Schedule and results

Rankings

References

Stanford
Stanford Cardinal baseball seasons
Stanford Cardinal